Robert Lee Smith may refer to:
 Bob Smith (fullback) (1929–2005), American football fullback
 Bobby Smith (running back) (born 1942), former American football collegiate and professional player
 Bobby Smith (safety) (born 1938), former American football player in the National Football League